Dieneria is a genus of ceratitid ammonoid cephalopods from the Late Triassic of western North America with a smooth discoidal shall of which the venter is truncate and the suture simple. Only the first lateral lobe is slightly serrated, the other lobes entire (smooth)

Dieneria, named by Hyatt and Smith, 1905, was first found in the Carnian of California and is now also known from British Columbia. According to the American Treatise Part L, 1957, Dieneria belongs to the Carnitidae, a component family of the Ceratitaceae. Subsequently, Dieneria was reassigned to the Klamathitidae Tozer, 1994, included in the Pinacocerataceae

References 

 Arkell, et al., 1957. Mesozoic Ammonoidea, Treatise in Invertebrate Paleontology, Part L (L157). Geological Society of America. 
 Dieneria entry in the Paleobiology Database 

Pinacocerataceae
Triassic ammonites of North America
Ceratitida genera
Late Triassic life